Khafrak-e Olya Rural District is a rural district (dehestan) in Seyyedan District, Marvdasht County, Fars Province, Iran. At the 2006 census, its population was 9,987, in 2,621 families.  The rural district has 9 villages.

References 

Rural Districts of Fars Province
Marvdasht County